Los Ángeles is the capital of the province of Bío Bío, in the commune of the same name, in Bío Bío, in the center-south of Chile. It is located between the Laja and Biobío rivers. The population is 186,671 inhabitants (census 2012). The municipality ("comuna") of Los Ángeles has the highest absolute rural population of any Chilean municipality.

The city is a gateway for tourists visiting the nearby Laguna del Laja National Park, the location of the volcano.

Los Ángeles is served by María Dolores Airport.

History
Founded as Nuestra Señora de Los Ángeles (Our Lady of the Angels) in 1739 by José Antonio Manso de Velasco, it was originally a Spanish fort as an outpost in the War of Arauco. It received the title of villa in 1748. The city underwent numerous rebuildings, due to the Spanish military campaigns against the native Mapuche in their efforts to colonize the area. Its geographic location, just to the north of the Biobío river (the border established by the Spaniards), made it a strategic location.

In 1858, during the process of German immigration in Chile, Colonia Humán was founded, a town colonized by German settlers from Germany and Austro-Hungarian Empire and which was completely conurbated within the current urban limits of the city.

Demographics
Of these, 123,445 (74.1%) lived in urban areas and 43,111 (25.9%) in rural areas. The population grew by 18.5% (26,021 persons) between the 1992 and 2002 censuses.

Within the communities of historical immigrants of the city of foreign origin, the Spanish, Arabs, Germans, and Swiss stand out, depending on their number and contributions, from the colonized localities by Europeans in the area, especially from Araucanía.

Climate 
This region experiences warm (but not hot) and dry summers, with no average monthly temperatures above 71.6 °F. According to the Köppen Climate Classification system, Los Ángeles has a warm-summer Mediterranean climate, abbreviated "Csb" on climate maps. Most of the annual precipitation of 42 inches (1070 mm) falls during the autumn and winter months of April through September. May is the wettest month, with 10 inches (250 mm) of precipitation on average. Snow is uncommon, and when it falls melts quickly.

Administration
As a commune, Los Ángeles is a third-level administrative division of Chile administered by a municipal council, headed by an alcalde who is directly elected every four years. The 2008-2012 alcalde is Joel Rosales Guzmán (UDI).

Within the electoral divisions of Chile, Los Ángeles is represented in the Chamber of Deputies by Juan Lobos (UDI) and José Pérez (PRSD) as part of the 47th electoral district, together with Tucapel, Antuco, Quilleco, Santa Bárbara, Quilaco, Mulchén, Negrete, Nacimiento, San Rosendo, Laja and Alto Bío Bío. The commune is represented in the Senate by Victor Pérez Varela (UDI) and Mariano Ruiz-Esquide Jara (PDC) as part of the 13th senatorial constituency (Biobío-Coast).

Popular culture
The author Roberto Bolaño spent much of his childhood here.

The 90's Alternative music artist Frank Black wrote a song about a place in "South Patagonia" called Los Angeles, the first track off of his eponymous album; while the Chilean Los Angeles lies just north of the northernmost part of Patagonia (demarcated as south of the Huincul Fault according to geographical definitions), it is probable that Black is referring to the Chilean Los Angeles.

Education
International schools
Deutsche Schule Los Angeles

References

External links

  Municipality of Los Ángeles
 

 
Communes of Chile
Capitals of Chilean provinces
Populated places established in 1739
Populated places in Bío Bío Province
1739 establishments in the Spanish Empire